Dave Kelly may refer to:
Dave Kelly (actor), Canadian TV host and voice actor
Dave Kelly (musician) (born 1947), British guitarist, vocalist, and member of the Blues Band
Dave Kelly (producer) (born 1969), Jamaican songwriter, musician, engineer, producer, and owner of Madhouse Records in Jamaica
Dave Kelly (ice hockey, born 1952), retired  Canadian ice hockey player, played for the Detroit Red Wings
Dave Kelly (ice hockey, born 1943), retired Canadian minor league ice hockey player
Dave Kelly (politician) (born 1962), Western Australian politician
Dave Kelly (darts player) (born 1958), American darts player

See also
David Kelly (disambiguation)
David Kelley (disambiguation)